DFCC Bank was set up in 1955 as Sri Lanka's a pioneer development finance institution on the recommendation of the World Bank and is one of the oldest development banks in Asia.

In October 2015, DFCC Bank and its 99% owned subsidiary, DFCC Vardhana Bank amalgamated. DFCC Bank is now a Licensed Commercial Bank offering a range of development banking and commercial banking products and services.

Subsidiary companies
DFCC Consulting (Pvt) Limited
Lanka Industrial Estates Limited
Synapsys Limited
Acuity Partners (Pvt) Limited
National Asset Management Limited

See also 
 List of banks in Sri Lanka

References

Banks of Sri Lanka
Banks established in 1955
1955 establishments in Ceylon
Companies listed on the Colombo Stock Exchange